Vasa syndrome is a term used in both management and marketing circles referring to problems in communication and management affecting projects, sometimes causing them to fail. Its basis lies with the Swedish 17th-century warship Vasa, a ship that sank on its maiden voyage because it was too unstable. 

The disaster of the Vasa has been interpreted by management experts to have been caused by problems with communication, goal setting, and adaptability. The sinking of Vasa has also been used as an example for business managers on how to learn from previous mistakes.

History

Vasa syndrome is inspired by the disastrous sinking of the Swedish warship  on its short maiden voyage in 1628. Vasa was one of the earliest examples of a warship with two full gun decks, and was built when the theoretic principles of shipbuilding were still poorly understood. The safety margins at the time were also far below anything that would be acceptable today. Combined with the fact that 17th-century warships were built with intentionally high superstructures (to be used as firing platforms), this made Vasa a risky undertaking.

Gustavus Adolphus, King of Sweden 1611–1632, was waging war on the European continent in the 1620s commissioned the ship and insisted on swift completion of what was intended to be the pride of his fleet. Despite stability tests that showed that Vasa was dangerously unstable, she was allowed to sail in August 1628.

The fiasco of Vasas sinking has been ascribed variously to a supposed lengthening of the ship in mid-construction, constant meddling in minor details by the king (who was abroad waging war) and problems in communication between the various parties involved. Though these claims are today considered to have little support in contemporary sources, the idea of Vasa as a flawed project has remained, especially in view of the fact that she did sink without ever firing a single shot in anger.

In relation to marketing and product innovation 

Vasa syndrome refers to the need to stay realistic in terms of strategy and project management. Also, organizations need to keep their goals matched to their capabilities. Decision makers need to have access to unbiased (both internal and external) information and there needs to be processes in place that will allow for the flow of information throughout the organization. Internal sources allow firms to develop core competencies while external sources enable companies to develop a wider knowledge base and also to stay updated on new technologies. Through changes such as in customer needs, advancements or breakthroughs in technology, and changes in competition, companies may find it necessary to alter their goals. If company coordination is poor, this can make the new goals confusing. This will affect product development at both the strategic and product management levels. It is important that organizations keep their goals and objectives clear so that their new projects and activities are not being doubted by company employees.

Another problem that companies need to avoid is the desire to create a product on a shortened timeline. Although the idea of first-mover advantage seems like it would be worth speeding up the innovation process, "some researchers have pointed out the disadvantages of pioneering new technologies and concluded that it is sometimes better to go slower and be a follower instead of a pioneer".

There were a number of examples which demonstrated the effects of the Vasa syndrome. For example, while handling the Hubble Space Telescope, NASA failed to learn from previous mistakes and repeated many of the same mistakes in product development and project management that led to the Space Shuttle Challenger disaster. The knowledge gained from the Challenger was not stored in the organizational memory and therefore was not available to create sufficient corrective mechanisms.

Another example used to demonstrate the effect of the Vasa syndrome is Greyhound Lines's attempt to design and implement a new computerized reservation system in 1993, modeled after a similar American Airlines system. Greyhound managers did not fully understand the technology and lacked sufficient knowledge of the bus industry. Because they attempted to copy a product they did not fully understand and a product that ended up being quite different from what they needed, the project was a complete failure.

See also
 The Dilbert principle, a more humorous take on problems with executive meddling.

Notes

References
 Cederlund, Carl Olof (2006) Vasa I, The Archaeology of a Swedish Warship of 1628, series editor: Fred Hocker; Statens maritima museer, Stockholm. 
 Hocker, Fred (2011) Vasa: A Swedish Warship. Medströms Bokförlag, Stockholm.

External links
 SNAFU principle, a related problem related to communications within a hierarchy

Project management
Failure